Super Bikeways in metropolitan Copenhagen are a network of high quality bikeways under development to promote commuting by bicycle in metropolitan Copenhagen, Denmark. A collaboration between Copenhagen Municipality and 18 surrounding municipalities in Greater Copenhagen. The objective is to facilitate and increase commuting by bicycle.

When finished, the network will consist of 26 routes and 300 km of bikeways. The first route, from Albertslund to Copenhagen, was inaugurated on 14 April 2012.

Super bikeways completed 2016–2018

Planned routes
The routes planned are as follows (further details and maps can be found here):
 Albertslund Route (17.5 km) — Albertslund, Glostrup, Rødovre, Frederiksberg and Copenhagen Municipalities
 Amagerbrogade Route (4.5 km) — Tårnby and Copenhagen Municipalities.
 Ballerup Route (11.1 km) — Ballerup Herlev and Copenhagen Municipalities
 Birkerød Route (19.8 km) — Rudersdal, Lyngby-Taarbæk, Gentofte and Copenhagen Municipalities. Possible extension to Allerød Municipality.
 Damhus Route (12.5 km) — Frederiksberg and Copenhagen Municipalities.
 Dragør East Route (13.3 km) — Dragør, Tårnby and Copenhagen Municipalities.
 Dragør West Route (11.2 km) — Dragør, Tårnby and Copenhagen Municipalities.
 Farum Route (20.9 km) — Furesø, Gladsaxe and Copenhagen Municipalities.
 Fasanvej Route (12.4 km) — Frederiksberg and Copenhagen Municipalities
 Gammel Holte Route (18.8 km) — Rudersdal, Lyngby-Taarbæk, Gentofte and Copenhagen Municipalities. Possible extension to Hørsholm Municipality.
 Harbour Route (4 km) — Temporary proposal, inner city
 Lake Route (7 km) — Temporary proposal, inner city.
 Rampart Route (5 km) — Temporary proposal inner city.
 Inner Ring Route (14.5 km) — Frederiksberg and Copenhagen Municipalities.
 Ishøj Route (12.3 km) — Ishøj, Vallensbæk, Brøndby, Hvidovre and Copenhagen Municipalities.
 Park Allé Route (12.5 km) — Vallensbæk, Brøndby, Hvidovre and Copenhagen Municipalities.
 Ring 3 Route (21 km) — Lyngby-Taarbæk, Gladsaxe, Herlev, Glostrup, Brøndby and Vallensbæk Municipalities.
 Ring 4 Route (10.7 km) — Lyngby-Taarbæk, Gladsaxe, Furesø, Gerlev, Ballerup and Albertslund Municipalities.
 Roskildevej Route (15.8 km) — Albertslund, Brøndby, Glostrup, Hvidovre, Frederiksberg and Copenhagen.
 Vandlednings Route (2.9 km) — Gladsaxe and Copenhagen Municipalities.
 Vestamager Route (7.8 km) — Tårnby and Copenhagen Municipalities.
 Vestbane Route (15.7 km) — Albertslund, Brøndby, Glostrup, Hvidovre and Copenhagen Municipalities.
 Vestvold Route (14 km) — Hvidovre, Brøndby, Rødovre and Copenhagen Municipalities.
 Vestvold East Route (11.1 km) — Hvidovre, Copenhagen and Tårnby Municipalities.
 Ørestad Route (7.8 km) — Tårnby and Copenhagen Municipalities.
 Øresund Route (22.3 km) — Rudersdal, Lyngby-Taarbæk, Gentofte and Copenhagen Municipalities.

External links
 about the project

References

Cycling in Copenhagen